Selby Burt (12 December 1903 – 14 February 1959) was an Australian cricketer. He played two first-class matches for New South Wales between 1928/29 and 1929/30.

See also
 List of New South Wales representative cricketers

References

External links
 

1903 births
1959 deaths
Australian cricketers
New South Wales cricketers
People from New England (New South Wales)
Cricketers from New South Wales